The vice president of India is the second highest constitutional office in the government of India after the president. In accordance with Article 63 of the Constitution of India, the vice president discharges the functions of the president when a contingency arises due to the resignation, removal, death, impeachment or the inability of the president to discharge their functions. They are also the ex officio chairperson of the Rajya Sabha, the upper house of the Parliament of India.

The vice president is elected by an electoral college consisting of all members of both houses of the Parliament in accordance with the system of proportional representation by means of the single transferable vote via a secret ballot conducted by the Election Commission of India. Once elected the vice president continues in office for a five-year term, but can continue in office irrespective of the expiry of the term, until a successor assumes office. They can be removed by a resolution passed by an effective majority in the Rajya Sabha. They are responsible for the protection of the rights and privileges of the members of the Council of States. They also decide whether a bill introduced in the Rajya Sabha is a financial bill.
There have been 14 vice presidents since the inception of the post in 1950. The first vice president of India, Sarvepalli Radhakrishnan, took oath at Rashtrapati Bhavan on 13 May 1952. He later served as the president. Following the death of Zakir Husain in 1969, Varahagiri Venkata Giri resigned from the post of vice president to contest the presidential election and got elected. Out of 14 vice presidents, six of them later went on to become the president. Krishna Kant has been the only one to die during his tenure. M. Venkaiah Naidu is the first vice president to be born after Independent India is formed.

On 11 August 2022, Jagdeep Dhankhar took office as the 14th vice president.

List
This list is numbered based on vice presidents elected after winning an Indian vice presidential election. The vice president of India does not represent any political party. The colors used in the table indicate the following:

Legend

Key
  Resigned
  Died in office

Statistics
 

Timeline

See also
 President of India
 Vice President of India
 Prime Minister of India
 Deputy Prime Minister of India
 List of presidents of India
 List of prime ministers of India
 Spouse of the Vice President of India

References

External links
 Vice-President of India (official website)

India
List
Lists of political office-holders in India
Lists relating to the Indian presidency
India, vice presidents
India